Command and Staff Training Institute (CSTI) is a Bangladeshi government owned defense college that provides training to Military officers specially Air force officers. Group Captain Md Sharif Mustafa, BPP, fawc, psc, GD(P) is the current Commander of CSTI.

References 

Air force academies
Bangladesh Air Force
Bangladesh Armed Forces education and training establishments